Governors of Hiroshima Prefecture served from 1871, when the Japanese government abolished the position of the daimyō of Hiroshima. Until 1947, the governors of Hiroshima Prefecture were appointed by the Ministry of Internal Affairs in Tokyo, but from 1947 onward they were elected.

Appointed governors 1871–1947 
 Viscount Kōno Togama 15 Aug – 15 Nov 1871
 Senbon Hisanobu 15 Nov – 27 Nov 1871
 Viscount Kōno Togama 27 Nov – 26 Dec 1871
 Date Muneoki 26 Dec 1871 – 25 Jan 1875
 Fujii Tsutomu 25 Jan 1875 – 6 Apr 1880
 Sadaaki Senda 6 Apr 1880 – 26 Dec 1889
 Baron Nabeshima Miki 26 Dec 1889 – 23 Apr 1896
 Orita Hiraochi 23 Apr 1896 – 7 Apr 1897
 Asada Tokunori 7 Apr 1897 – 14 May 1898
 Baron Takatoshi Iwamura 14 May – 28 Jul 1898
 Hattori Ichizo 28 Jul – 28 Dec 1898
 Egi Kazuyuki 28 Dec 1898 – 29 Jun 1903
 Tokuhisa Tsunenori 29 Jun 1903 – 25 Jan 1904
 Yamada Shunzō 25 Jan 1904 – 11 Jan 1907
 Tadashi Munakata 11 Jan 1907 – 28 Mar 1912
 Nakamura Junkuro 28 Mar 1912 – 27 Feb 1913
 Terada Yushi 27 Feb 1913 – 28 Apr 1916
 Eitaro Mabuchi 28 Apr 1916 – 7 May 1918
 Yasukouchi Asakichi 7 May 1918 – 18 Apr 1919
 Raizo Wakabayashi 18 Apr 1919 – 19 Jul 1921
 Ichiro Yoda 19 Jul 1921 – 16 Oct 1922
 Kamehiko Abe 16 Oct 1922 – 25 Oct 1923
 Jiro Yamagata 25 Oct 1923 – 16 Sep 1925
 Tsunenosuke Hamada 16 Sep 1925 – 28 Sep 1926
 Kaiichiro Suematsu 28 Sep 1926 – 7 Nov 1927
 Sukenari Yokoyama 7 Nov 1927 – 25 May 1928
 Masao Kishimoto 25 May 1928 – 5 Jul 1929
 Hiroshi Kawabuchi 5 Jul 1929 – 8 May 1931
 Takekai Shirane 8 May – 18 Dec 1931 
 Ryo Chiba 18 Dec 1931 – 28 Jun 1932
 Michio Yuzawa 28 Jun 1932 – 15 Jan 1935
 Keiichi Suzuki 15 Jan 1935 – 22 Apr 1936
 Saburo Hayakawa 18 Apr 1936 – 8 Jan 1937
 Aijiro Tomita 8 Jan 1937 – 9 Nov 1938
 Ichisho Inuma 9 Nov 1938 – 5 Sep 1939
 Katsuroku Aikawa 5 Sep 1939 – 26 Mar 1941
 Tokiji Yoshinaga 26 Mar 1941 – 15 Jun 1942
 Saiichiro Miyamura 15 Jun 1942 – 1 Jul 1943
 Sukenari Yokoyama 1 Jul 1943 – 1 Aug 1944
 Mitsuma Matsumura 1 Aug 1944 – 21 Apr 1945
 Korekiyo Otsuka 21 Apr – 10 Jun 1945
 Genshin Takano 10 Jun – 11 Oct 1945
 Kyuichi Kodama 11 Oct – 27 Oct 1945
 Tsunei Kusunose 27 Oct 1945 – 14 Mar 1947
 Shinichiro Takekawa 14 Mar – 16 Apr 1947

Elected governors 1947–present 
 Tsunei Kusunose 16 Apr 1947 – 29 Nov 1950
 Hiroo Ōhara 24 Jan 1951 – 13 Apr 1962
 Izuo Nagano 29 May 1962 – 10 Nov 1973
 Hiroshi Miyazawa 16 Dec 1973 – 29 Oct 1981
 Toranosuke Takeshita 29 Nov 1981 – 28 Nov 1993
 Yūzan Fujita 29 Nov 1993 – 29 Nov 2009
 Hidehiko Yuzaki 29 Nov 2009 – present

External links 
 List of Japanese prefectural governors

 
Hiroshima Prefecture
Hiroshima Prefecture